The 1938 All-Ireland Senior Camogie Championship Final was the seventh All-Ireland Final and the deciding match of the 1938 All-Ireland Senior Camogie Championship, an inter-county camogie tournament for the top teams in Ireland.

The poor state of the field militated against a fast game. Dublin won by six points.

References

Camogie
All-Ireland Senior Camogie Championship Finals
Cork county camogie team matches
Dublin county camogie team matches